Metra is a commuter railroad in the Chicago area.

Metra may also refer to:
 Mettā, a Buddhist philosophy
 METRA Transit System, transportation provider in Muscogee County, Georgia, United States
 Metra Electronics, American automotive electronics company
 Metra Theatre, a theatre company in London 
 Metra potential method, a project management technique

People 
 Cecilia Metra, electrical engineer at the University of Bologna, Italy
 Louis-François Metra (1738–1804), French journalist
 Olivier Métra (1830–1889), French composer and conductor